Altererythrobacter rigui is a Gram-negative, aerobic and non-motile bacterium from the genus of Altererythrobacter which has been isolated from water from the Woopo wetland in Korea.

References

External links
Type strain of Altererythrobacter rigui at BacDive -  the Bacterial Diversity Metadatabase

Sphingomonadales
Bacteria described in 2016